Hyperion is a coast redwood (Sequoia sempervirens) in California that is considered the world's tallest known living tree, measuring 115.92 m (380.3 ft).

Hyperion was discovered on August 25, 2006, by naturalists Chris Atkins and Michael Taylor. It was found in a remote area of Redwood National Park purchased in 1978. It is estimated to contain  of wood. The park also houses the second and third known tallest trees, named Helios and Icarus. Hyperion is estimated to be 700 to 800 years old.

The exact location of the Hyperion tree is nominally secret but is available via internet search.  In July 2022, the Redwood Park superintendent closed the entire area around the tree, citing "devastation of the habitat surrounding Hyperion" caused by visitors.

Researchers have said that woodpecker activity at the top may have prevented the tree from growing taller.

See also 
 List of superlative trees
 List of individual trees
 List of tallest trees

References

External links 
 National Geographic Video: "World's Tallest Tree Towers Over California"
 M.D. Vaden.com: Information about the Hyperion Coast Redwood Tree
 BBC Radio documentary featuring Hyperion

Individual coast redwood trees
Redwood National and State Parks